Kristal or Kristal Football Club is a Indonesian football team based in Oepoi Stadium, Kupang, East Nusa Tenggara. This team competes in Liga 3 East Nusa Tenggara Zone.

References

External links

Kupang
Football clubs in East Nusa Tenggara